Myron H. Reed (September 19, 1836October 9, 1907) was an American lawyer, Democratic politician, and Wisconsin pioneer.  He was the 2nd mayor of Waupaca, Wisconsin, and represented that area in the Wisconsin State Senate during the 1871 and 1872 sessions.

Biography
Reed was born on September 19, 1836, in Massena, New York.  He received an academic education at Union Academy in Belleville, New York, and graduated from the law school at Albany University in 1858.  The following year, he moved to Waupaca, Wisconsin, where he became a junior partner to Milan H. Sessions in his legal practice.  Their partnership continued until 1870, when they faced off as opponents for election to the Wisconsin State Senate.

Reed was a member of the Democratic Party, and was elected to the Wisconsin Senate from Wisconsin's 27th State Senate district, which then comprised Marathon, Portage, Waupaca, and Wood counties.  He defeated Sessions in the November 1870 election, receiving 55% of the vote.  He was nominated for another term in the Senate in 1872, but declined the nomination.

He was active in the government of the village of Waupaca, and after it was incorporated as a city, in 1875, he was elected as the second mayor of the city, serving from April 1876 through April 1877.  He also served on the city council and county board.

He left Waupaca County in 1889 and moved north to Superior, Wisconsin, where he remained for much of the rest of his life.  In his final years, he retired to a home on Lake Nebagamon, in Douglas County, Wisconsin.

After an illness of several months, he was taken to Minneapolis, Minnesota, for care at the home of his son.  He died there on October 9, 1907.

Personal life and family
Myron Reed was survived by his wife and two children.

He was prominent in Freemasonry in Wisconsin and was grand master of the state for two terms.

Electoral history

Wisconsin Senate (1870)

| colspan="6" style="text-align:center;background-color: #e9e9e9;"| General Election, November 8, 1870

References

1836 births
1907 deaths
People from Massena, New York
People from Waupaca, Wisconsin
People from Superior, Wisconsin
Democratic Party Wisconsin state senators
Wisconsin city council members
Mayors of places in Wisconsin